Fissuria is a genus of minute freshwater snails with an operculum, aquatic gastropod molluscs or micromolluscs in the family Hydrobiidae.

Species
Species within the genus Fissuria include:
Fissuria bovi Boeters, 1981

References

 Fauna Europaea info

Hydrobiidae
Taxonomy articles created by Polbot